Robert Hassell (13 August 1876 – 13 July 1947) was a British swimmer. He competed in the men's 1500 metre freestyle event at the 1908 Summer Olympics. Some sources list him as Richard Hassell, but contemporary newspapers do not support this.

References

1876 births
1947 deaths
British male swimmers
Olympic swimmers of Great Britain
Swimmers at the 1908 Summer Olympics
People from Bermondsey
Sportspeople from London
British male freestyle swimmers
20th-century British people